Joe Lane Travis (born July 6, 1931) was an American politician in the state of Kentucky. He served in the Kentucky Senate as a Republican from 1981 to 1988.

References

1931 births
Living people
Republican Party Kentucky state senators